Alexeyevka is a rural locality (a selo) in Tsvetnovsky Selsoviet of Volodarsky District, Astrakhan Oblast, Russia. The population was 233 as of 2010. There are 6 streets.

Geography 
Alexeyevka is located 34 km south of Volodarsky (the district's administrative centre) by road. Zelyony Ostrov is the nearest rural locality.

References 

Rural localities in Volodarsky District, Astrakhan Oblast